Janvislu or Janveslou (also Romanized as Jānvīslū; also known as Jāneslū and Jānveslū) is a village in Baranduz Rural District, in the Central District of Urmia County, West Azerbaijan Province, Iran. At the 2006 census, its population was 408, in 109 families.

References 

Populated places in Urmia County